NCCA may refer to:
 National Centre for Computer Animation, part of the Media School at Bournemouth University in the United Kingdom
 National Centre for Contemporary Arts, a museum, exhibition and research organization in Moscow, Russia
 National Championship of College A Cappella, former name of International Championship of Collegiate A Cappella, a singing competition
 National Collegiate Cycling Association, a division of USA Cycling
 National Commission for Certifying Agencies, the accreditation body of the Institute for Credentialing Excellence
 National Commission for Culture and the Arts, official arts council of the Philippines
 National Council for Curriculum and Assessment, a statutory organization that provides the primary school curriculum in Ireland
 National Council of Churches in Australia, an ecumenical organisation
 Neuroblastoma Children's Cancer Alliance UK, charity that helps children and families
Nigerian Civil Aviation Authority
 Northern Centre for Contemporary Art, Darwin, Australia

See also
NCAA (disambiguation)